Nil Mısır (born 1987) is a Turkish Paralympian archer competing in the Women's compound bow W1 event.

Private life
In 2002, Mısır fell doen from the fifth floor of her apartmen in Fatih, Istanbul. She became paralyzed due to paraplegia, and reliant on wheelchair.

Sports career
Her sports career begam when a major Turkish newspaper reported about her life story. She so drew the attention of coach Ebru Öztürk Esen of the Turkey Paralympic Sports Federation. Mısır is a member pf Olçular Vakfı S.K. in Istanbul.

At the 2022 World Para Archery Championships in Dubai, United Arab Emirates, she won two silver medals, one in the Women W1 event, which is the first achievement of her country in this discipline, and another one in the Women W1 Doubles event together with her teammate Fatma Danabaş.

References

1987 births
Living people
People from Fatih
Sportspeople from Istanbul
Turkish female archers
Paralympic archers of Turkey
Wheelchair category Paralympic competitors
Islamic Solidarity Games medalists in archery
21st-century Turkish sportswomen